El-Jaish Sports Club was a Qatari multi-sports club from 2011 to 2017, based in the Al-Duhail area of Doha. The association football team played in the Qatar Stars League. The team won the Qatargas League prior to 2011, but were not eligible for promotion and as a result were not declared as the champions of the league. It was promoted to the first division, the Stars League, the first year after it was made eligible.

The club also had participations in other sports, most notably in handball where its team has previously achieved 3rd place in both, the GCC Handball Championship, and the Asian Club Handball Championship.

In April 2017, it was announced that the club would be taken over by Lekhwiya SC following the 2016–17 Qatar Stars League, and merge into Lekhwiya SC which would be rebranded into Al-Duhail SC.

History
El Jaish SC was officially established in 2011 after spending several seasons in the second division without being eligible for promotion.

In its first season in the Qatar Stars League, El Jaish finished second, just two points behind champions Lekhwiya, and qualified for the 2013 AFC Champions League. After a poor start to the 2013 Champions League, El Jaish won 3 of its 4 last group stage games to emerge as the groups runners-up, setting up a Round of 16 tie against Al Ahli of Saudi Arabia. They were eliminated after losing 0–2 in the away game and 1–3 on aggregate.

In 2013, El Jaish were involved in the controversial case of Zahir Belounis not being granted an exit visa over his dispute with the club over unpaid wages.

Lekhwiya SC announced that they have taken over the club in April 2017 and the club dissolved in July 2017 while Lekhwiya got rebranded into Al-Debaih SC.

Honours
 Qatari Stars Cup
Winners (1): 2012–13

 Qatar Cup
Winners (2): 2014, 2016

 Qatargas League
Winners (1): 2010–11

Note:
El-Jaish were winners of the Qatargas League in 2007–08 and 2008–09 but the club was not officiated yet so they don't count as official championships

El Jaish in Asia

Q = Qualification
GS = Group stage
R16 = Round of 16
QF = Quarter-final
SF = Semi-final

AFC Champions League

Personnel

Senior team

Youth team
Last update: May 24, 2013

Management

Associated clubs
 FC Schalke 04

Kit sponsors and manufacturers

Managerial history
 Mohammed Al Ammari (July 2007 – May 2011) /  Yousef Al Nobi (assistant)
 Péricles Chamusca (June 15, 2011 – May 31, 2012) /  Marcelo Chamusca (assistant)
 Răzvan Lucescu (June 1, 2012 – Jan 15, 2014) /  Mihai Stoica (assistant)
 Yousef Adam (Jan 15, 2014 – Jan 21, 2014) /  Yousef Al Nobi (assistant)
 Nabil Maâloul (Jan 21, 2014 – Jan 26, 2014) /  Yousef Adam (assistant)
 Nabil Maâloul (Jan 26, 2014 – Dec 11, 2014) /  Lassaad Chabbi (assistant)
 Abdulqadir Almoghaisab (Dec 12, 2014 – Dec 27, 2014) /  Lassaad Chabbi (assistant)
 Sabri Lamouchi (Dec 27, 2014 – Jul 1, 2017) /  Lassaad Chabbi (assistant)

Handball

References

External links
 Official website

 
Football clubs in Qatar
Football clubs in Doha
2007 establishments in Qatar
Military association football clubs